Andrzej Sołtan (25 October 1897 – 10 December 1959) was a Polish nuclear physicist. He also worked on spectroscopy in the band between far ultraviolet and X-rays. During his visit to Caltech in 1932–33, together with H. Richard Crane and Charles Christian Lauritsen, he discovered a method for producing neutron beams, by bombarding lithium or beryllium nuclei with accelerated deuterons.

He was appointed professor at Warsaw University in 1947, a member of the Polish Academy of Sciences in 1952, and in 1955 he became the first director of the Institute of Nuclear Research in Świerk, Otwock County near Warsaw, now known as the National Centre for Nuclear Research. He served as president of the Polish Physical Society between 1952 and 1955.

He is buried (with his wife Marta, also a physicist) in the "Avenue of the Meritorious" of Warsaw's Powązki Cemetery.

References
 Brief biography (in polish) at the National Centre for Nuclear Research

External links
 National Centre for Nuclear Research (NCBJ)

1897 births
1959 deaths
20th-century Polish physicists
Polish nuclear physicists
Members of the Polish Academy of Sciences
Burials at Powązki Cemetery
Andrzej